Ellen C. Covito (born 1974) is an Argentinian composer. She is known most for her Composed Improvisation and Improvised Composition series.

Covito's early works consisted in attempts to apply theoretical structures and ideas surrounding environmental problems to music.

Her works since 2009 deal with the dichotomy between composition and improvisation. She does this by introducing distance between the performer and what is performed, while removing the distance between the act of composition and performance.

In May 2012, the first concert of Covito's music outside Buenos Aires was organized in Brooklyn by Panoply Performance Laboratory and No Collective.

In September 2012, another concert of Covito's music was organized in Tokyo by No Collective and the Ensemble for Experimental Theatre and Music.

References

Further reading
Ellen C. Covito: Works After Weather. Already Not Yet (2014).

External links

The Music of Ellen C. Covito in Tokyo

Argentine composers
Living people
1974 births
Date of birth missing (living people)
Place of birth missing (living people)
Argentine women composers